Qurshaqlui-ye Kord (also Romanized as Qūrshāqlūī-ye Kord; also known as Chatū Kandī and Shāh Pasand) is a village in Gejlarat-e Sharqi Rural District, Aras District, Poldasht County, West Azerbaijan Province, Iran. At the 2006 census, its population was 269, in 50 families.

References 

Populated places in Poldasht County